James Merritt Harrison,  (September 20, 1915 – July 6, 1990) was a Canadian scientist and public servant. He was the Director of the Geological Survey of Canada from 1956 to 1964, and Assistant Deputy Minister of the Department of Energy, Mines and Resources.

Biography
Born in Regina, Saskatchewan, he obtained his B.Sc. from the University of Manitoba in 1935. He received his M.A. in 1941 and Ph.D. in 1943 from Queen's University.

He was one of the founders of the Union of Geological Sciences (IUGS) and was its first President from 1961 to 1964. Between 1966 and 1968, he was President of the International Council for Science (ICSU).

In 1969, Harrison was awarded the Logan Medal, the Geological Association of Canada's highest honour.

From January 1973 to March 1976, he was the Assistant Director-General for Natural Sciences at the United Nations Educational, Scientific and Cultural Organization in Paris.

In 1971, he was made a Companion of the Order of Canada.

References
 Canadian Mining Hall of Fame citation
 James Merritt Harrison Obituary

1915 births
1990 deaths
20th-century Canadian geologists
Geological Survey of Canada personnel
Companions of the Order of Canada
People from Regina, Saskatchewan
Logan Medal recipients
Members of the United States National Academy of Sciences
University of Manitoba alumni
Queen's University at Kingston alumni
Scientists from Saskatchewan